The Czech Republic competed at the 2002 Winter Olympics in Salt Lake City, United States.

Medalists

Alpine skiing

Men

Men's combined

Women

Women's combined

Biathlon

Men

Men's 4 × 7.5 km relay

Women

Women's 4 × 7.5 km relay

 1 A penalty loop of 150 metres had to be skied per missed target. 
 2 Starting delay based on 10 km sprint results. 
 3 One minute added per missed target. 
 4 Starting delay based on 7.5 km sprint results.

Bobsleigh

Men

Cross-country skiing

Men
Sprint

Pursuit

 1 Starting delay based on 10 km C. results. 
 C = Classical style, F = Freestyle

4 × 10 km relay

Women
Sprint

Pursuit

 2 Starting delay based on 5 km C. results. 
 C = Classical style, F = Freestyle

4 × 5 km relay

Figure skating

Pairs

Ice Dancing

Freestyle skiing

Men

Women

Ice hockey

Men's tournament

First round - Group C

Quarter final

Team roster:
Milan Hnilička
Roman Čechmánek
Dominik Hašek
Roman Hamrlík
Jaroslav Špaček
Pavel Kubina
Tomáš Kaberle
Michal Sýkora
Martin Škoula
Richard Šmehlík
Martin Havlát
Pavel Patera
Petr Čajánek
Petr Sýkora
Radek Dvořák
Robert Lang
Robert Reichel
Milan Hejduk
Patrik Eliáš
Martin Ručinský
Jiří Dopita
Jan Hrdina
Jaromír Jágr
Head coach: Josef Augusta

Luge

Men

Women

Nordic combined 

Men's sprint

Events:
 large hill ski jumping
 7.5 km cross-country skiing 

Men's individual

Events:
 normal hill ski jumping
 15 km cross-country skiing 

Men's Team

Four participants per team.

Events:
 normal hill ski jumping
 5 km cross-country skiing

Short track speed skating

Women

Skeleton

Men

Ski jumping 

Men's team large hill

 1 Four teams members performed two jumps each.

Speed skating

Men

References
 Olympic Winter Games 2002, full results by sports-reference.com

Nations at the 2002 Winter Olympics
2002
2002 in Czech sport